Bloody Springs is an inhabited area in Tishomingo County, Mississippi. It is located at 538 feet above sea level. The community is located off of  County Road 85. There is a graveyard in the area. Bloody Springs was included in an article on the strangest town names in America.

The community was first settled in the early 1800s. Hunting is a common pastime for residents.

References

Unincorporated communities in Mississippi
Unincorporated communities in Tishomingo County, Mississippi